Jessie Joe Nandye (born 22nd Aug 1985), also commonly known by his former name Jessie Joe Parker, is a Papua New Guinean former rugby league footballer who last played as a  for Whitehaven in Betfred League 1.

He is a Papua New Guinean international representative.

Playing career
After several impressive seasons in the PNG domestic league, Parker signed with the Northern Pride of the Queensland Cup in 2009. In 2010, he joined the Featherstone Rovers. Parker signed a two-year contract with the Wakefield Trinity Wildcats of the Super League in September 2010, but was released after he did not report for 2011 pre-season training. He joined Whitehaven in 2012 alongside fellow Papua New Guinean Glen Nami. Parker played his 100th match for Whitehaven on 28 March 2016 in their defeat by the Batley Bulldogs.

Coaching career
Jesse Joe Parker became player/coach of NCL 3 side Hensingham ARLFC for the 2022 season.  He is currently the clubs top scorer with 13 trys.

Representative career
Parker represented Papua New Guinea in 2007 when they played matches against France and Wales in Europe. In 2008, he was part of PNG's squad for the 2008 World Cup. He scored a try for PNG while competing at the 2009 Pacific Cup. Parker played for PNG at the 2010 Four Nations. He was a member of PNG's 2013 World Cup squad and scored a try against Samoa.

References

External links
Whitehaven profile
Featherstone Rovers profile

1985 births
Living people
Expatriate rugby league players in England
Featherstone Rovers players
Masta Mark Rangers players
Mendi Muruks players
Northern Pride RLFC players
Papua New Guinea national rugby league team players
Papua New Guinean expatriate rugby league players
Papua New Guinean expatriate sportspeople in the United Kingdom
Papua New Guinean rugby league players
Rugby league centres
Rugby league five-eighths
Rugby league fullbacks
Wakefield Trinity players
Whitehaven R.L.F.C. players